Sir Francis Henry Drake, 4th Baronet   (1694–1740) of Buckland Abbey, Devon was a British landowner and politician who sat in the House of Commons from 1715 to 1740.

Early life
Drake was the eldest surviving son  of Sir Francis Drake, 3rd Baronet and his third wife. Elizabeth Pollexfen, daughter of Sir Henry Pollexfen of Nutwell Court, Devon, and was baptized on 2 March 1694. He was educated privately. Drake's father died in January 1718 and he succeeded to the baronetcy and the heavily encumbered estate.  He made a financially advantageous marriage to Anne Heathcote, daughter of Samuel Heathcote merchant of Clapton House, Hackney, Middlesex on 29 September 1720  and was able to pay off the debts with his wife's money. She was the sister  of Sir William Heathcote, 1st Baronet. He succeeded his uncle Henry Pollexfen to the estate of Nutwell Court in 1732.

Career
At the 1715 general election Drake was returned as Member of Parliament for Tavistock jointly on his own and the Bedford interest. He was returned unopposed at Tavistock in 1722  and 1727. He was also returned in 1727 for Bere Alston where the family controlled one seat, but chose to sit for Tavistock. The new Duke of Bedford did not support him  at  Tavistock at the 1734 general election and he was defeated. However, he was returned for Bere Alston again and took his seat there until his death.

Death and legacy
Drake died of pleuritic fever at his lodgings at Covent Garden on 26 January 1740. Lady Ann Drake was  buried at Hackney on 5 November  1768. They had three sons
Sir Francis Henry Drake, 5th Baronet who succeeded to the baronetcy
Francis William Drake, who married his first cousin, Sir William Heathcote's daughter, Elizabeth in 1763. 
Sir Francis Samuel Drake, 1st Baronet who became a baronet in his own right
They also had two daughters

References

1694 births
1740 deaths
British MPs 1715–1722
British MPs 1722–1727
British MPs 1727–1734
British MPs 1734–1741
Members of the Parliament of Great Britain for Bere Alston
Baronets in the Baronetage of England
Members of the Parliament of Great Britain for Tavistock